Margaret Robb (born 17 June 1942) is a Canadian speed skater. She competed in four events at the 1960 Winter Olympics.

References

1942 births
Living people
Canadian female speed skaters
Olympic speed skaters of Canada
Speed skaters at the 1960 Winter Olympics
Sportspeople from Saskatoon